Start a Fire was the first official release of the American rock band Neon Trees. The EP was only available for sale at shows their late 2009 tour supporting Nico Vega and was limited to one pressing of 500 units.

All the tracks on the EP were recorded at Microphone Action Squad in Orem, Utah and were produced and engineered by Scott Wiley.

A video for the unofficial single, "Calling My Name", was shot at Muse Music in Provo, Utah.

"Phones" is one of the oldest Neon Trees tracks, dating back to before Elaine and Branden were in the group.

Track listing

Personnel
Tyler Glenn – vocals, synths
Chris Allen – guitars, vocals
Branden Campbell – bass, vocals
Elaine Bradley – drums, vocals

2009 EPs
Neon Trees albums